The 2003 ULEB Cup Finals were the final matches of the 2002–03 ULEB Cup season, the first season of Europe's second tier basketball league.

Pamesa Valencia won the Finals with an aggregate score of 166–156 against Krka. Valencia's Dejan Tomašević was named the Eurocup Finals MVP.

Summary

References

Semi-finals
2002–03 in Spanish basketball
2002–03 in Slovenian basketball
2003
International basketball competitions hosted by Spain